Eesti talent ("Estonian Talent") is the Estonian version of the Got Talent series. It was launched on TV3 on 9 October 2010. Singers, dancers, comedians, variety acts, and other performers compete against each other for audience support. The winner of the show receives 250,000 kroons (c. €16,000, c. US$20,500). It is hosted by singers Eda-Ines Etti and Tanel Padar. The judges are music critic and journalist Mihkel Raud, who is known by being judges of many other TV shows; musician, enterpriser and politician Valdo Randpere, model and dancer Kristiina Heinmets-Aigro. The show is produced by RUUT productions and FremantleMedia.
The first auditions took place in Pärnu on 14 August 2010.

Semi-final summary
The "Order" columns lists the order of appearance each act made for every episode.

Semi-final 1

Semi-final 2

Semi-final 3

Final

References

2010 Estonian television series debuts
Got Talent
2010s Estonian television series
Television series by Fremantle (company)
Estonian reality television series
Non-British television series based on British television series
TV3 (Estonia) original programming